Qaemabad Rural District may refer to:
 Qaemabad Rural District (Nimruz County), Sistan and Baluchestan province
 Qaemabad Rural District (Shahriar County), Tehran province